René Grillet de Roven, also René Grilliet, was a French mechanic and watchmaker who designed a mechanical calculating machine in the 17th century.

Biography 
Grillet came from Rouen in northwestern France, the capital city of Normandy. He served as watchmaker to King Louis XIV.

In 1673 Grillet published a small book, Curiositez mathematiques de l'invention du Sr Grillet horlogeur a Paris, in which he announced the invention of an arithmetical calculating machine.  A few years later, in 1678, he wrote a short article in Le Journal des Sçavans describing the machine.  According to Grillet, he was inspired by Blaise Pascal's work with calculating machines to combine the Pascaline with Napier's bones, and build a machine that could perform both addition and multiplication.

Grillet displayed his machine at fairs in France and the Netherlands between 1673 and 1681.  He tried to establish a business of manufacturing and selling calculating machines, with unclear success.

In addition to the calculating machine, in his career Grillet invented a hygrometer (for which he was accused of plagiarism by another inventor); graphometers; drawing instrument set; protractor, set square, with plumb-bob.

In 1690, the first textile-printing factory in England was established by a Frenchman named René Grillet, who took out a patent on the process.

References 

Michael R. Williams History of Computing Technology, IEEE Press 1997 (Kapitel 3.6: René Grillet)
Michael R. Williams From Napier to Lucas. The use of Napier's Bones in calculating instruments,Annals of the History of Computing, Band 5, Nr. 3, 1983, S. 279-296

External links 
 Stephan Weiss Die Rechenkästen nach Schott und ihre Simulation, pdf
 Biography of René Grillet de Roven

French watchmakers (people)
Engineers from Rouen
17th-century births
Year of death missing